Tarsney Lakes is an unincorporated community and census-designated place (CDP) in Jackson County, Missouri, United States. It is in the eastern part of the county, northeast of the unincorporated community of Tarsney, and consisting of residential neighborhoods surrounding Tarsney Lake and Wood Lake, just south of the West Fork of Sni-A-Bar Creek.

Tarsney Lakes was first listed as a CDP prior to the 2020 census.

Demographics

References 

Census-designated places in Jackson County, Missouri
Census-designated places in Missouri